The 2000 United States Senate election in North Dakota was held on November 7, 2000. Incumbent Democratic-NPL U.S. Senator Kent Conrad won re-election to a third term.

Candidates

Democratic-NPL 
 Kent Conrad, incumbent U.S. Senator

Republican 
 Duane Sand, Naval Reserve officer

Results

See also 
 2000 United States Senate elections

References

External links 
 2000 North Dakota U.S. Senate Election results

North Dakota
2000
2000 North Dakota elections